Akhmerovo (Äxmär) is a rural locality (a village) in Tukansky Selsoviet, Beloretsky District, Bashkortostan, Russia. The population was 24 as of 2010. There are 3 streets.

Geography 
Akhmerovo is located 74 km southwest of Beloretsk (the district's administrative centre) by road. Bzyak is the nearest rural locality.

References 

Rural localities in Beloretsky District